Diego Cervantes (born 11 February 2001) is a Mexican foil fencer. He competed in the 2020 Summer Olympics held in Tokyo, Japan.

References

External links
 Ohio State Buckeyes bio

2001 births
Living people
Mexican male foil fencers
Olympic fencers of Mexico
Fencers at the 2020 Summer Olympics
Sportspeople from Mexicali
Ohio State Buckeyes fencers
Fencers at the 2018 Summer Youth Olympics
21st-century Mexican people